Rudkhaneh (also Romanized as Rūdkhāneh) is a village in Dasht-e Veyl Rural District, Rahmatabad and Blukat District, Rudbar County, Gilan Province, Iran. At the 2006 census, its population was 109, in 34 families.

References 

Populated places in Rudbar County